The members of the 18th Manitoba Legislature were elected in the Manitoba general election held in June 1927. The legislature sat from December 1, 1927, to May 7, 1932.

The Progressive Party of Manitoba led by John Bracken formed the government.

Fawcett Taylor of the Conservatives was Leader of the Opposition.

The Minimum Wage Act, which previously only applied to female workers, was amended to include male workers under the age of 18. The minimum wage was $0.25 per hour.

Philippe Adjutor Talbot served as speaker for the assembly.

There were five sessions of the 18th Legislature:

Theodore Arthur Burrows was Lieutenant Governor of Manitoba until January 18, 1929, when James Duncan McGregor became lieutenant governor.

Members of the Assembly 
The following members were elected to the assembly in 1927:

Notes:

By-elections 
By-elections were held to replace members for various reasons:

Notes:

References 

Terms of the Manitoba Legislature
1927 establishments in Manitoba
1932 disestablishments in Manitoba